Mikhail Volinkin (uzb. Mixail Volinkin Viktorovich born February 1, 1994) is an Uzbekistani professional bodybuilder and winner of Arnold Amateuer Classics 2018 overall in heavyweight category.

Early life 
When he was 4 his family moved to Tashkent, Uzbekistan.  His family left him and he grew up in an orphanage. He has always been devoted to sports.  When he was young he started training in taekwandoo, kickboxing and parkour.

Bodybuilding career 
He started his career in bodybuilding in 2012 when he became National champion of Uzbekistan two years in a row. (2012-2013). In 2013, he won his first International title at Asian Championships in Kazakhstan, Alma-Ata. The 6th WBPF World Championship was a major international competition in bodybuilding and fitness, as governed by the World Bodybuilding and Physique Federation (WBPF). It took place in Bombay Exhibition Centre, Mumbai, India More than 300 contestants from 33 countries participated in the championship. Mikhail Volinkin took 1st place on  Men Junior +70 kg category. That was his first world championship title and first bodybuilder from Uzbekistan became World Champion. Next year at the 7th WBPF World Championship that hold in Thailand, Bangkok took again 1st place of Championships. His best win as amateuer bodybuilder was at Arnold Amateuer Classic 2018. Mikhail Volinkin won the overall Men’s Bodybuilding title as more than 600 of the top amateur competitors from around the world competed in 10 divisions at the 12th Annual Arnold Amateur NPC International Championships.

Professional contest 
Mikhail Volinkin obtained pro status after his big win at the 2018 Arnold Classic Amateur competition. He hoped to make good on his IFBB pro status and compete against the best bodybuilders in the world. He became the first ever winning athlete from Central Asia to receive a IFBB pro card.  He made his Pro debut (at 24 he was youngest in the field) in the IFBB Arnold Classic 2019 among other top bodybuilders and with his massive physique and hard work he always wants to impress his muscle fans and made the best impression in the bodybuilding world. His second IFBB tournemaent that held in South Korea, Seoul Monsterzym Pro 2019, he took place 7th at Men's Bodybuilding category.

Athlete Statistics 
•	Height: 5 ft 7 in (171 cm)

•	Off Season Weight: 290 pounds (130 kg)

•	Competition Weight: 242 pounds (110 kg)

•	Upper Arm Size: 24 in (54 cm)

•	Chest: 52in  (132 cm)

•	Thigh Size: 29 in (78 cm)

•	Waist Size: 35 in (90 cm)

•	Calf Size: 20 in (51 cm)

Bodybuilding titles 
Amateur

•	2012  Uzbekistan Open Championship – 1st

•	2013 Uzbekistan Open Championship– 1st

•	2013 Central Asian Championships (Kazakhstan, Alma-Ata)–1st

•	2014 6th WBPF World Championship  (Mumbai, India)– 1st

•	2014 7th WBPF World Championship  (Thailand, Bangkok)– 1st

•	2015 Overall Asian Champion (Uzbekistan, Tashkent) – 1st

•	2016 Overall Asian Champion  – 1st

•	2016 Overall Central Asian Champion (Kazakhstan, Aktau)- 1st

•	2016 Asian Championship (Bhutan, Thimphu) – 2nd

•	2017Overall Champion of Uzbekistan (Uzbekistan, Tashkent) – 1st

•	2017 Overall Central Asian Champion (Kazakhstan, Aktobe) 1st

•	2017 Asian Championship (South Korea, Seoul) – 2nd

•	2017 9th WBPF World Championship  (Mongolia, Ulan-Bator) – 1st

•	2018 Arnold Amateuer Classic (Overall Champion) (Columbus, OHIO) – 1st

•	Professional

•	2019 Arnold Classic Pro (Columbus, OHIO) – 12th

•	2019 Monsterzym Pro Men’s Bodybuilding – 7th

References

External links 

 Official website
 

Living people
1994 births
Professional bodybuilders
Uzbekistani bodybuilders